The 2020 Ole Miss Rebels football team represented the University of Mississippi in the 2020 NCAA Division I FBS football season. The Rebels played their home games at Vaught–Hemingway Stadium in Oxford, Mississippi, and competed in the Western Division of the Southeastern Conference (SEC). They were led by first-year head coach Lane Kiffin.

Previous season
The Rebels finished the 2019 season 4–8, 2–6 in SEC play to finish in sixth place in the Western Division. Head coach Matt Luke was fired on December 1, 2019 following an overall three-year record of 15–21 and SEC record of 6–18. Lane Kiffin was hired on December 7 following two conference championships in three seasons at Florida Atlantic.

Preseason

Award watch lists
Listed in the order that they were released

SEC Media Days
In the preseason media poll, Ole Miss was predicted to finish in a tie for fifth place in the West Division.

Recruiting

Incoming transfers

Schedule
Ole Miss had games scheduled against Baylor (Texas Kickoff),  Georgia Southern, Southeast Missouri State, and UConn, but were canceled due to the response to the COVID-19 pandemic.

Schedule Source:

Game summaries

No. 5 Florida

at Kentucky

No. 2 Alabama

*The most total yards ever to be gained against an Alabama football team in team history

at Arkansas

Auburn

at Vanderbilt

South Carolina

Mississippi State

at LSU

vs. Indiana (Outback Bowl)

Coaching staff

Players drafted into the NFL

References

Ole Miss
Ole Miss Rebels football seasons
ReliaQuest Bowl champion seasons
Ole Miss Rebels football